Ariete was a Spanish . Ariete was launched in 1955 and completed in 1961. The ship was lost when she ran aground on 25 February 1966.

Design
The Audaz class was based on the French  design, plans for which had been provided to Spain by Nazi Germany after the Fall of France, but with a revised armament. Ariete was modified during construction to a revised design as anti-submarine escorts, with a completely new armament and sensor outfit. 

Displacement was  standard and  full load. The ship had a unit machinery layout, with boiler and engine rooms alternating. The ship had a complement of 191. 

Anti-aircraft armament consisted of two US  Mark 34 guns mounted aft and two  Bofors L/70 guns, with one forward of the bridge and one aft of the ship's funnels. Two Hedgehog anti-submarine mortars were fitted, together with eight depth-charge throwers and two depth charge racks, and two launchers for  Mark 32 anti-submarine torpedoes. Sensors consisted of MLA-1B air-search radar, SPS-5B surface search radar and SPG-34 fire control radar, with QHBa sonar.

Construction and service
Ariete was laid down at Sociedad Española de Construcción Naval's, Ferrol shipyard on 3 August 1945. Financial problems slowed construction, and she was not launched until 24 February 1955. The availability of US Aid under the Mutual Defense Assistance Program allowed Ariete to be completed to a modified design as an anti-submarine frigate, and Ariete entered service on 7 February 1961, with the pennant number D 36. As with all the ships of her class, Ariete joined the 31st Escort Squadron, based at Ferrol. On 25 February 1966, Ariete ran aground off the coast of Galicia after an engine failure and was wrecked, with the ship's hull breaking up.

References

Sources

Ariete
Ariete
Ariete